Tribasodites hubeiensis is a species of beetle first found in Hubei, China.

References

Staphylinidae
Beetles described in 2015
Insects of China